Amaba is a community under Isuikwuato, a local government area in Abia State in southeastern Nigeria.

Important landmarks in Amaba include the Nigerian Railway Station and Abosso Apostolic Faith Church of Jesus Christ. Century Hotels is also located at Amaba. Amaba shares boundaries with Ovim, Ezere, Umuasua, and Otampa.

Some prominent people and leaders in Amaba include Late Eze Josiah Madubuike, Late Bishop PDE Ejiofo, Late Eze Gospel Ugwa, Dr Ezeawu Madukwe, Late Sir Reuben Egbulonu, Mrs Mamaocha Okemiri among others

References

 

Populated places in Abia State